The Kamëz Stadium is a sports stadium in Kamëz, Tirana County, Albania. The ground is owned and managed by the Municipality of Kamëz, and it is the home ground of Kamza 05 and Kastrioti.

See also 
 List of Albanian football stadia by capacity
 List of stadiums in Albania

References 

FC Kamza
Buildings and structures in Kamëz
Buildings and structures in Tirana County
Sports venues in Albania
Football venues in Albania
Sports venues completed in 2008
Kategoria Superiore venues
Kategoria e Parë venues